Stan Atkinson was a television news reporter and anchor for over 45 years, mostly in the Sacramento area, including many years as the principal news anchor for KCRA, Channel 3, in Sacramento. and then principal news anchor for KOVR from 1994 until his retirement in 1999.  He is considered one of the most popular news figures in Sacramento, the nation's 19th-largest television market, for more than 20 years. The Sacramento Bee called him "The Man Who Owns Sacramento."

He has remained tirelessly active in community affairs since retirement, helping raise money for charities and as TV/radio spokesperson for a number of companies.  He is also a partner in a very busy video production company ATY Media Productions.

Career highlights
Atkinson is a reporter who regularly travelled to the world's most turbulent places to bring a deeper insight to the local evening news.  He covered 18 countries-in-crisis in 31 assignments.  As well, his work was often featured on national television. 

Atkinson studied journalism at Pasadena City College prior to U.S. Army service during the Korean War in the early 1950s.  He was an instructor on Fort Ord’s faculty teaching 20,000 trainees and rapidly rising to the rank of Sergeant.  He was one of 25 (out of 200) reporters selected for the prestigious Ford Foundation Journalism Fellowship at Stanford University in 1967.

He has been chased down by a Soviet helicopter gunship in Afghanistan (he was there twice, in 1982 and 1985), plus held up and robbed by leftist guerrillas in El Salvador, and shot at in Cambodia.

In January 1996, Atkinson covered the presence of U.S. Forces in Bosnia.  In May 1997 he made his ninth trip to Hong Kong since 1961 to report on the historic reunification with Communist China.

He has slipped across Marxist-controlled borders with resistance fighters to produce documentaries in Afghanistan, Angola, Cambodia, and Central America.

Atkinson reported from Baghdad just before Operation Desert Storm began, and from Kuwait a month after it was liberated. In October 1993, just after the downing of two U.S. Blackhawk helicopters, and the resultant withdrawal of American forces, he covered the collapse of a nation into anarchy in his reports from Somalia.

In April 1994, Atkinson covered the remarkable transition of South Africa, as their citizens voted in the country's first all-race, democratic election. That was his third assignment in South Africa since 1984.

Atkinson also has a long history with Vietnam. He was there twice - in 1961 and 1962 - when it was still "The Dirty Little War" in the south. His documentary, "The Village That Refused to Die," told the story of fighting priest Father Nguyễn Lạc Hoá and his village of Binh Hung, who were fighting back against the Viet Cong.

In 1987, he took former Green Beret Captain - B.T. Collins - back to Vietnam. They were the first Americans to drive through the country since the war. They traveled from Hanoi to the Delta, to the very spot where Collins lost an arm and a leg in an ambush 20 years before. Atkinson later joined Collins as a principal fundraiser who helped raise money to erect the $2.2 million California Vietnam Veterans Memorial on the State Capitol grounds.

He has won three Emmys for each of his two assignments inside Afghanistan, and another for a documentary he produced while covering Somalia in 1981.

Atkinson is the 1989 winner of the George Washington Medal for Individual Achievement from the Freedom Foundation in Valley Forge, Pennsylvania.  He is also a recipient of the World Affairs Council Award for International Reporting, and the Albert and Mary Lasker Award for Medical Journalism.

Community volunteer service
He still resides in Sacramento and contributes to the community.

Atkinson, through his Stan Atkinson Foundation, has partnered with the Sacramento River Cats baseball team and the East Sacramento Rotary to raise funds to build River Cat's Independence Field, a multi-use sports and recreation facility for disabled youth and adults.  The project centers on a specially-applied surface, which provides traction but is soft, thus preventing injuries during softball, basketball, soccer, or tag football games.

He was co-founder and host of the Stan Atkinson Golf Classic for its five-year run. The event, in partnership with the Stan Atkinson Foundation, raised more than $300,000 for five area community causes.

Atkinson also served the Gold Rush Classic, an annual stop on the Senior PGA Tour, as tournament director-community relations and as a member of the Classic’s Board of Directors.

He has been named to the SAY Golf 2004 Hall of Fame, in the company of Kevin Sutherland, Al Geiberger, Tommy LoPresti, and Beth Hightower - not for his golfing prowess (of which there is none), but for the money he has helped raise over the years through and for youth golf, and the community at large.

In 2001, Atkinson was the Chair of the Mercy Foundation, a multi-million dollar fund that supports three dozen charitable and essential community projects of the works of the Sisters of Mercy.  He has been on the Foundation’s board for 24 years.

Atkinson has helped raise more than $8 million for area agencies and charities. He is the recipient of the United Way's Humanitarian of the Year award, the National Philanthropy Association's Volunteer Fund-Raiser of the Year award, and has been honored as the Boy Scouts of America's Distinguished Citizen of the Year.

Recognitions and achievements
In 1999, he was the recipient of the Sacramento Regional Foundation’s first-ever Lifetime Achievement Award.  And in 1998 the Sacramento Metropolitan Chamber of Commerce named Atkinson "Sacramentan of the Year."

Atkinson received a Distinguished Service Medal in 1986 from the FNLA (National Front for the Liberation of Angola), an Angolan anti-communist guerrilla group with whom he had traveled in the bush in 1985. He also received a similar commendation from the Afghan freedom fighters.

Atkinson had been honored by the State Legislature; the Sacramento County Board of Supervisors; Sacramento City Council, and the Congressional Record.

He has been a documentary producer, writer and director for David Wolper Productions, a reporter and anchorman for NBC, Los Angeles, and in the San Francisco Bay Area. As a result, he is a familiar face and name statewide.

Atkinson serves on the boards of Mercy Foundation, the First Tee of Greater Sacramento, the Advisory Board of California State University, Sacramento, and the WEAVE endowment board. He is also an honorary member of the Rotary Club of Sacramento, an Eddie Mulligan Fellow of Rotary, and an honorary member of the 20-30 Club of Sacramento.  He’s also a member of the Broadcast Legends, and the Valley Broadcast Legends.

He is the father of four sons: Brad, Mike, Alex, Lance Atkinson, and a daughter Sarah. Lance died suddenly of undetermined causes in April 1994.  The Lance Atkinson Scholarship was established at California State University, Sacramento shortly after his death.  It is modeled after the National Merit Scholarship and is on track to become the University’s first National Merit Scholarship program.

In October 1996 Atkinson married the former Kristen McCann. He is the grandfather of 14 children.

Atkinson retired in 1999, after 46 years in television and radio.  A dozen years ago he was among the first group of selectees named to the National Television Academy of Television Arts and Sciences Silver Circle as a television pioneer.

On May 17, 2007, Atkinson was inducted into the Greater Sacramento Area Business Hall of Fame, an event benefiting Junior Achievement of Sacramento. Atkinson was chosen for this honor by an independent selection committee made up of regional business leaders. Atkinson was included in the permanent Business Hall of Fame exhibit at the School of Business Administration at CSU Sacramento.

References

 

Pasadena City College alumni
Stanford University alumni
American television reporters and correspondents
Living people
Television anchors from Sacramento, California
American war correspondents
1932 births